The Rivers State Ministry of Environment (RSMENV) is a ministry of the Government of Rivers State established in 2003 to deal with matters relating to the environment.  Its functions include formulating, implementing and reviewing of policies on the state's environmental/ecological programs and projects. The mission is generally targeted to ensure a clean and safe environment. The ministry currently has its headquarters at 1st Floor, State Secretariat, Port Harcourt.

Vision 
To cause a systematic environmental remediation through transparent pursuit of sectoral green policies, public engagement and equitable enforcement of environmental legislations.

Mission 
To establish acceptable environmental standards, policies and programmes that will enhance and promote a green economy in a healthy and sustainable state.

Departments
The Rivers State Ministry of Environment currently has 9 departments. Each department has unique functions it performs.

Administration
Flood and Erosion and Coastal Zone Managements
Environment Planning, Research and Statistics
Environmental Health and Safety
Claims, Compensations and Relief
Inspectorate and Enforcement
Pollution Control
Finance and Accounts
Internal Audit Unit

List of commissioners

 Nyema E. Weli

See also
Government of Rivers State
Government ministries of Rivers State

References

External links
Government of Rivers State

Environment
Environment ministries
Environment of Rivers State
Ministries established in 2003
2003 establishments in Nigeria
2000s establishments in Rivers State
Rivers